HMCS Preserver is the name of three ships of the Royal Canadian Navy:

 , leadship of the Fairmile-support depot ships
 , a 
 HMCS Preserver, formerly named HMCS Châteauguay, a planned

Battle Honours
 Arabian Sea

See also
 Preserver-class Fairmile depot ship

References

 Directorate of History and Heritage - HMCS Preserver 
 South-West Asia Theatre Honours

Royal Canadian Navy ship names